The canton of Tréguier is an administrative division of the Côtes-d'Armor department, northwestern France. Its borders were modified at the French canton reorganisation which came into effect in March 2015. Its seat is in Tréguier.

It consists of the following communes:
 
Camlez
Coatréven
Kerbors
Langoat
Lanmérin
Lanmodez
Lézardrieux
Minihy-Tréguier
Penvénan
Pleubian
Pleudaniel
Pleumeur-Gautier
Plougrescant
Plouguiel
La Roche-Jaudy
Trédarzec
Tréguier
Trézény
Troguéry

References

Cantons of Côtes-d'Armor